Roosevelt Tate (March 10, 1911 – December 25, 1968), nicknamed "Speed" and "Bill", was an American Negro league outfielder in the 1930s.

A native of Bessemer, Alabama, Tate made his Negro leagues debut in 1931 for the Knoxville Giants. The following season, he split time between the Birmingham Black Barons, Nashville Elite Giants, and Louisville Black Caps. Tate's final professional season came in 1937, when he played for the Cincinnati Tigers and Chicago American Giants. He died in Bessemer in 1968 at age 57.

References

External links
 and Seamheads

1911 births
1968 deaths
Birmingham Black Barons players
Chicago American Giants players
Cincinnati Tigers (baseball) players
Louisville Black Caps players
Nashville Elite Giants players
Baseball outfielders
20th-century African-American sportspeople